Dortmund-Löttringhausen station is on the former Rhenish Railway Company in the suburb of Löttringhausen in the Dortmund district of Hombruch in the German state of North Rhine-Westphalia.

General 
The station is located on the former Düsseldorf-Derendorf–Dortmund Süd railway opened by the Rhenish Railway Company (Rheinischen Eisenbahn-Gesellschaft) between 1873 and 1879. Dortmund-Löttringhausen station was also the terminus of former Dortmund-Löttringhausen–Bochum-Langendreer railway, the so-called Rheinischer Esel ("Rhenish ass"), which opened in 1880. Löttringhausen station was built to serve the nearby, economically important Gottessegen coal mine. Shortly south of Löttringhausen station is the Ender Tunnel, where the railway crosses the Ardey Hills.

Current condition 
Today only one two-way track is operational. The remains of the old station (old platform, a row of trees, old station sign, etc.) are still visible. On an adjoining property there are only remnants of the former roundhouse in the form of rubble. An extensive renovation of the station was completed in May 2013.

Services

The station is currently served by one Regionalbahn line:

The station is served by bus line 448 to Witten-Rüdinghausen via Dortmund-Barop.

References

External links

Railway stations in Dortmund
Railway stations in Germany opened in 1879